Burçak Poçan, née Özoğlu, (1970) is a mountaineer and one of the first Turkish women to climb over 8,000 m.

Burçak was born on January 4, 1970, in Ankara. Following her graduation from the School of Business Administration at the Middle East Technical University in Ankara with a BA degree, she earned a MA and PhD degree in labor economics from the School of Political Sciences at Ankara University. Burçak is currently a lecturer at the same university.

In 1989, she enlisted in a four-year course for mountaineering during her university time at the Middle East Technical University. She made the first female ascent of the north face of Mount Büyük Demirkazık (3,756 m) in Turkey in 1995. She climbed Mount Elbrus (5,642 m) in the Caucasus in 1996 and in the same year climbed Khan Tengri (7,010 m) in the Tian Shan range, a height record at the time for a Turkish woman. In 1997, she climbed Mount Damavand (5,610 m), the highest peak in Iran.

She became one of the first Turkish women to climb over 8,000 m when she summited Gasherbrum II (8,035 m), the 13th highest peak of the world, via west face along with Eylem Elif Maviş, on July 22, 2005.

Burçak took part in the Petrol Ofisi-sponsored Turkish expedition team to Mount Everest in 2006. However, due to throat complaints at 8,600 m, she had to give up the ascent on May 15 and return to advanced base camp for medical aid. She reached the summit on her second attempt on May 24, 2006, along with five other teammates, including two women.
 
Burçak is married to mountaineer Serhan Poçan, who had climbed Mount Everest on the same day as her.

Awards
 1996 "Mountaineer of the Year" by the Turkish Mountain Climbing Federation

References
 Short biography in Turkish
 Story of Mt Everest expedition

1970 births
Middle East Technical University alumni
Ankara University alumni
Living people
Sportspeople from Ankara
Turkish mountain climbers
Turkish summiters of Mount Everest
Turkish sportswomen
Female climbers